Aurore Mongel (born 19 April 1982 in Épinal, France) is a national record holding and Olympic butterfly swimmer from France. She swam for France at the 2008 Olympics, where she set the French record in the 200 m butterfly (2:06.49).

She was the 2008 European Champion in the 200 m butterfly (long course).

On 29 July 2009, she bettered her French record in the 200 m butterfly to 2:05.09 in semifinals of the event at the 2009 World Championships.

References

1982 births
Living people
French female freestyle swimmers
French female butterfly swimmers
Sportspeople from Épinal
World Aquatics Championships medalists in swimming
Olympic swimmers of France
Swimmers at the 2004 Summer Olympics
Swimmers at the 2008 Summer Olympics
European Aquatics Championships medalists in swimming
Mediterranean Games gold medalists for France
Swimmers at the 2005 Mediterranean Games
Universiade medalists in swimming
Mediterranean Games medalists in swimming
Universiade gold medalists for France
Medalists at the 2003 Summer Universiade
20th-century French women
21st-century French women